Airton Sandoval Santana (born 21 June 1943 in Itirapuã) is a Brazilian lawyer and politician affiliated to the Brazilian Democratic Movement Party (PMDB).

Sandoval was elected in 2010 as 1st Substitute of senator Aloysio Nunes, but officially assumed office as senator after Nunes assumed office as Minister of Foreign Affairs, appointed by president Michel Temer.

References

1943 births
Living people
People from São Paulo (state)
Brazilian Democratic Movement politicians
National Renewal Alliance politicians
Members of the Chamber of Deputies (Brazil) from São Paulo
Members of the Federal Senate (Brazil)
20th-century Brazilian lawyers